Jeremy Michael Unser Jr. (November 15, 1932 – May 17, 1959) was an American racecar driver. He was the 1957 USAC Stock Car champion.

Jerry was the first of the Unser family to compete at Indianapolis. In his only start, in 1958, he was caught up in a 13-car pileup on the first lap and flew over the turn three wall, emerging unhurt. He died in a practice crash before the 1959 Indianapolis 500, leaving behind a widow, Jeanne Unser, and two sons, Jerry and Johnny Unser.

His brothers Al and Bobby and his nephew Al Jr. have won the "500". His son Johnny and nephew Robby have also competed in the race.

Indianapolis 500 results

World Championship career summary
The Indianapolis 500 was part of the FIA World Championship from 1950 through 1960. Drivers competing at Indy during those years were credited with World Championship points and participation. Jerry Unser participated in 1 World Championship race but scored no World Championship points.

Complete Formula One World Championship results
(key) (Races in italics indicate fastest lap)

Death

On May 2, 1959, on the second day of qualifying for the 1959 Indianapolis 500, Unser lost control of his car coming out of turn 4 on a practice lap. The car hit the wall after spinning, then went end over end down the front straightaway, leaving behind a trail of parts. The car burst into flames as a result. Track officials estimated his speed just before the accident to be about 133 mph. He was conscious during his rescue, yelling "My legs are on fire. Call my wife." Before he could be pulled from the vehicle, the fire had to be put out. Unser was taken to Methodist Hospital with a broken neck and 3rd degree burns over both legs and one arm. In critical condition, he suffered burns over 35 percent of his body, and was in a coma. Unser died from his injuries and pneumonia two weeks later on May 17, 1959. Following the accident, it became mandatory for drivers to wear fire-resistant driving suits. Most drivers already wore the suits, but some drivers at the time wore t-shirts.

References

External links

1932 births
1959 deaths
Indianapolis 500 drivers
Sportspeople from Colorado Springs, Colorado
Racing drivers from Colorado
Racing drivers who died while racing
Sports deaths in Indiana
Unser family
USAC Stock Car drivers